Joseph Anne Leonard Gaudreault (October 19, 1905 – March 21, 1950) was a Canadian professional ice hockey forward who played 67 games in the National Hockey League for the Montreal Canadiens over three seasons between 1927 and 1933.

Born in Saint-Bruno, Quebec, the name Leonard, the birth year of 1902 and birthplace are confirmed with the Saint-Bruno Church records and Notre-Dame Basilica in Montreal that holds the records of Cote De Neiges Cemetery where he is buried.

Although all his biographies state Leo Gaudreault was born in Chicoutimi, Quebec, he spent his early childhood in Saint-Bruno, Lac Saint-Jean, where his father, Pitre Gaudreault, managed the general store. The family moved to Chicoutimi in 1912.

Gaudreault died in 1950 in Montreal, Quebec.

References

External links

 Family Tree at GENI

1902 births
1950 deaths
Canadian ice hockey forwards
Ice hockey people from Quebec
Minneapolis Millers (AHA) players
Montreal Canadiens players
People from Saguenay–Lac-Saint-Jean
Providence Reds players